Light's Diamond Jubilee (1954) is a two-hour TV special that aired on October 24, 1954, on all four U.S. television networks of the time, DuMont, CBS, NBC, and ABC. The special won a Primetime Emmy Award for Victor Young for Best Music for a Variety or Dramatic series.

The special was produced by David O. Selznick, had seven directors, and featured major stars of the day. The special was sponsored by General Electric in honor of the 75th anniversary of the invention of the incandescent light bulb by Thomas Edison. In 1929, a previous celebration of "light's golden jubilee" was produced by General Electric and created by PR pioneer Edward Bernays.

Robert Benchley's appearance was a segment from his MGM short film How to Raise a Baby (1938).

Episode status
A copy of the CBS Television version of the broadcast, showing a copyright notice of Selznick Releasing Organization Inc., is in the collection of the UCLA Film and Television Archive. The Library of Congress has copies available for viewing by appointment.

See also
List of programs broadcast by the DuMont Television Network
List of surviving DuMont Television Network broadcasts
General Foods 25th Anniversary Show: A Salute to Rodgers and Hammerstein (March 1954 TV special aired on all four American TV networks)

Bibliography
 David Weinstein, The Forgotten Network: DuMont and the Birth of American Television (Philadelphia: Temple University Press, 2004) 
 Alex McNeil, Total Television, Fourth edition (New York: Penguin Books, 1980) 
 Tim Brooks and Earle Marsh, The Complete Directory to Prime Time Network TV Shows, Third edition (New York: Ballantine Books, 1964)

References

External links

Light's Diamond Jubilee at BFI Database
Light's Diamond Jubilee at National Library of Australia

DuMont Television Network original programming
CBS television specials
NBC television specials
American Broadcasting Company television specials
Black-and-white American television shows
Films directed by King Vidor
Films directed by William A. Wellman
Films directed by Norman Taurog
Films directed by Roy Rowland
Films directed by Bud Yorkin
Films directed by Christian Nyby
General Electric sponsorships